Kittitas may refer to:
 Kittitas County, Washington
 Kittitas, Washington
 Kittitas (tribe)